The multipored bent-toed gecko (Cyrtodactylus multiporus) is a species of gecko that is endemic to Laos.

References 

Cyrtodactylus
Reptiles described in 2014